is a town located in Chiba Prefecture, Japan. , the town had an estimated population of  15,343 in 7,092 households and a population density of 650 persons per km². Kujūkuri owes its name to its beach, Kujūkuri Beach, which is Japan's second longest. The word "Kujūkuri" roughly translates to mean "ninety-nine ri", with "kujūku" meaning "ninety-nine" and "ri" being an old unit of measurement equating to approximately 600 meters.

Geography
Kujūkuri is located on the east-central Bōsō Peninsula, on the shore of the Pacific Ocean. It is about 30 kilometers from the prefectural capital at Chiba and 60 to 70 kilometers from central Tokyo.

Surrounding Municipalities
Chiba Prefecture
Tōgane
Sanmu
Ōamishirasato

Climate
Kujūkuri has a humid subtropical climate (Köppen Cfa) characterized by warm summers and cool winters with light to no snowfall.  The average annual temperature in Kujūkuri is 15.2 °C. The average annual rainfall is 1609 mm with September as the wettest month. The temperatures are highest on average in August, at around 26.0 °C, and lowest in January, at around 5.4 °C.

Demographics
Per Japanese census data, the population of Kujūkuri has declined in recent decades.

History
During the Edo period, the area was noted for its product of sweet potatoes. In the Meiji period, the villages of Katakai and Toyoumi were established within Sanbu District, Chiba with the creation of the modern municipalities system. on April 1, 1889. Katakai was raised to town status on April 10, 1926 and Toyoumi on February 11, 1940. The two towns merged with a  portion of the village of Naruhama on March 31, 1955 to form the town of Kujūkuri.

Government
Kujūkuri has a mayor-council form of government with a directly elected mayor and a unicameral town council of 14 members. Kujūkuri, collectively with the city of Sanmu and the other municipalities of Sanmu District, contributes two members to the Chiba Prefectural Assembly. In terms of national politics, the town is part of Chiba 11th district of the lower house of the Diet of Japan.

Economy
Commercial fishing and food processing (particularly sardine processing) remain the primary industries of Kujūkuri, although the town is primarily known as a beach resort, from its seaside location and mild climate, and attracts more than million tourists each year. Kujūkuri and surrounding towns are also popular surfing destinations. Efforts are underway to raise its profile including the establishment of the Tōgane Kujūkuri Toll Road to improve the town's accessibility and the opening of the Kujūkuri Sardine Museum as a point of cultural interest.

Education
Kujūkuri has three public elementary schools and two public middle schools operated by the town government, and one public high school operated by the Chiba Prefectural Board of Education.

Transportation 
Despite its popularity as a beach resort, Kujūkuri is not served by either railway or highway connections.

Local attractions
 Kujūkuri Beach
 Kujūkuri Sardine Museum

Sister city relations
 Kamiichi, Toyama since July 1965

Noted people from Kujūkuri 
Inō Tadataka, Edo period mapmaker

Gallery

References

External links

Official Website 

Towns in Chiba Prefecture
Populated coastal places in Japan
Kujūkuri